Norberto Quiroga (born 25 September 1959) is an Argentine alpine skier. He competed in three events at the 1980 Winter Olympics.

References

1959 births
Living people
Argentine male alpine skiers
Olympic alpine skiers of Argentina
Alpine skiers at the 1980 Winter Olympics
Sportspeople from Bariloche